Heydenius is a collective group genus of fossil nematodes from the Tertiary period that cannot be placed in extant genera.

Species
 †H. antiquus (von Heyden, 1860)
 †H. arachnius Poinar, 2012
 †H. araneus Poinar, 2000
 †H. brownii Poinar, 2001
 †H. cecidomyae Poinar, 2011
 †H. dipterophilus Poinar, 2011
 †H. dominicus Poinar, 1984
 †H. formicinus Poinar, 2002
 †H. lamprophilus Poinar, 2011
 †H. matutinus (Menge, 1866)
 †H. myrmecophila Poinar, Lachaud, Castillo & Infante, 2006
 †H. neotropicus Poinar, 2011
 †H. phasmatophilus Poinar, 2012
 †H. podenasae Poinar, 2012
 †H. psychodae Poinar, 2011
 †H. quadristriatus (Menge, 1872)
 †H. saprophilus Poinar, 2011
 †H. scatophilus Poinar, 2011
 †H. sciarophilus Poinar, 2011
 †H. simulphilus Poinar & Currie, 2019
 †H. tabanae Poinar, 2011
 †H. trichorosus Poinar, 2012

See also
 Cretacimermis

References

Mermithidae
Prehistoric protostome genera
Enoplea genera